Johannite is a rare uranium sulfate mineral. It crystallizes in the triclinic crystal system with the chemical composition Cu[UO2(OH)SO4]2·8H2O. It crystallizes in the triclinic system and develops only small prism or thin to thick tabular crystals, usually occurs as flaky or spheroidal aggregates and efflorescent coatings. Its color is emerald-green to apple-green and its streak is pale green.

Johannite is a strong radioactive mineral with a calculated activity of 87,501,143 Bq/g (to the comparison: natural potassium: 31.2 Bq/g).

Etymology and history 
Johannite was first described in 1830 by Wilhelm Karl Ritter von Haidinger. It was named for Archduke John of Austria (1782–1859), the founder of the Landesmuseum Joanneum (Styria, Austria).

Occurrence 
Johannite forms as secondary mineral by oxidation from uraninite as well as different other uranium minerals.

Localities include Argentina, Czech Republic, France, Gabon, Germany, Greece, Italy, Switzerland, United Kingdom and the United States. Type locality is the “Elias Mine” in Jáchymov (Czech Republic).

Crystal structure 
Johannite crystallizes in the triclinic crystal system in the space group P with the lattice parameters a = 8.92 Å, b = 9.59 Å, c = 6.84 Å; α = 110°, β = 111.98°, γ = 100.3° and one formula unit per unit cell.

References

Bibliography
Palache, P.; Berman H.; Frondel, C. (1960). "Dana's System of Mineralogy, Volume II: Halides, Nitrates, Borates, Carbonates, Sulfates, Phosphates, Arsenates, Tungstates, Molybdates, Etc. (Seventh Edition)" John Wiley and Sons, Inc., New York, pp. 606-607.

Copper(II) minerals
Uranium(VI) minerals
Sulfate minerals
Triclinic minerals
Minerals in space group 2